Seven is the seventh studio album by the jazz rock band Soft Machine, released in 1973. Roy Babbington, who had previously contributed to Fourth (1971) and Fifth (1972) on double bass as a session musician, replaced Hugh Hopper on bass guitar, who left to begin a solo career.

Overview
The album was issued on CBS Records with a colour gatefold cover in the UK, with black and white photos of the band members on the inside cover.  In the USA, Columbia Records released a single sleeve cover that moved the band photos to the front.  The title on the USA front cover is the numeral 7, but is spelled out as Seven on the spine and label.  Although this is a 1973 release, USA copies show a copyright date of 1974 (and a phonographic rights date of 1973), suggesting the North American release may have been delayed. It was the last of their studio releases to carry a numbered title.

The titles of the final two tracks are clearly intended as a joke.  The preceding track, "Down the Road", fades into a swirling abstract jumble of notes on keyboards which plays with little variation for three minutes before fading out, and there is nothing musically to indicate the transition from German to French lessons, and no explanation as to why these two tracks are credited to different composers.

Track listing

Side one
"Nettle Bed" (Karl Jenkins) – 4:47
"Carol Ann" (Jenkins) – 3:48
"Day's Eye" (Mike Ratledge) – 5:05
"Bone Fire" (Ratledge) – 0:32
"Tarabos" (Ratledge) – 4:32
"D.I.S." (John Marshall) – 3:02

Side two
"Snodland" (Jenkins) – 1:50
"Penny Hitch" (Jenkins) – 6:40
"Block" (Jenkins) – 4:17
"Down the Road" (Jenkins) – 5:48
"The German Lesson" (Ratledge) – 1:53
"The French Lesson" (Jenkins) – 1:01

Personnel
Soft Machine
Karl Jenkins – oboe, baritone and soprano saxophones, recorder, Fender Rhodes & Hohner Pianet electric pianos
Mike Ratledge – Fender Rhodes electric piano, Lowrey Holiday Deluxe organ, EMS Synthi AKS synthesizer
Roy Babbington – bass guitar, acoustic bass
John Marshall – drums, percussion

References

External links 
 Soft Machine - Seven (1973) album review by Dave Lynch, credits & releases at AllMusic
 Soft Machine - Seven (1973) album releases & credits at Discogs
 Soft Machine - Seven (1973) album to be listened on Spotify
 Soft Machine - Seven (1973) album to be listened on YouTube

Soft Machine albums
1973 albums
CBS Records albums
Columbia Records albums